The 2005–06 Mighty Ducks of Anaheim season was the 13th season of operation (12th season of play) for the National Hockey League franchise. This would be the last season the team would be called the "Mighty Ducks of Anaheim".

Off-season
On June 20, the Ducks hired Brian Burke as their executive vice president and general manager. Other key hirings included Bob Murray as the club's senior vice president of hockey operations on July 14 and Randy Carlyle as the head coach on August 1.

In the Entry Draft, the Mighty Ducks chose Bobby Ryan as their first-round pick, second overall. As the previous season had been cancelled, the draft order was set by lottery. The Mighty Ducks, given two balls in the lottery process, were likely to go in the middle of the pack, but instead received the second pick, the first going to the Pittsburgh Penguins, who selected Sidney Crosby.

The Mighty Ducks signed many free agents during the summer: Enforcers Todd Fedoruk, Kip Brennan, Travis Moen and Trevor Gillies, Defensemen Joe DiPenta and Scott Niedermayer, a former James Norris Memorial Trophy winner, who signed to play with his brother, Rob Niedermayer. Two former long-time Mighty Ducks rejoined the organisation, fan favorite Teemu Selanne and Jason Marshall.

Rookies Ryan Getzlaf, Corey Perry, Johan Hedstrom and Ilya Bryzglaov earned roster spots.

Several players were traded due to the new salary cap: Martin Gerber to the Carolina Hurricanes, Niclas Havelid to the Atlanta Thrashers, Vaclav Prospal to the Tampa Bay Lightning and team captain Steve Rucchin to the New York Rangers. Scott Niedermayer was named Rucchin's replacement as captain on October 3.

Regular season
The Ducks finished third in the Pacific Division and sixth overall in the Western Conference to qualify for the playoffs.

Final standings

Playoffs
The Ducks won a seven-game Conference Quarterfinals (4–3) against the Calgary Flames. The Ducks next took on and defeated the Colorado Avalanche in the Conference Semifinals. The Ducks then advanced to the Conference Final for the second time in franchise history, though they lost the series four games to one to the Edmonton Oilers.

Schedule and results

Preseason

|- align="center" bgcolor="#ffbbbb"
| 1 || September 17 || @ Kings || 4–2 ||  ||  ||  ||  || 0–1–0 || Staples Center || 
|- align="center" bgcolor="#ffdddd"
| 2 || September 21 || Sharks || 2–1 || SO ||  ||  ||  || 0–1–1 || Arrowhead Pond of Anaheim || 
|- align="center" bgcolor="#bbffbb"
| 3 || September 23 || Coyotes || 5–3 ||  ||  ||  ||  || 1–1–1 || Arrowhead Pond of Anaheim || 
|- align="center" bgcolor="#bbffbb"
| 4 || September 24 || @ Canucks || 4–2 ||  ||  ||  ||  || 2–1–1 || General Motors Place || 
|- align="center" bgcolor="#ffbbbb"
| 5 || September 25 || @ Sharks || 6–5 ||  ||  ||  ||  || 2–2–1 || HP Pavilion at San Jose || 
|- align="center" bgcolor="#ffbbbb"
| 6 || September 28 || Canucks || 3–1 ||  ||  ||  ||  || 2–3–1 || Arrowhead Pond of Anaheim || 
|- align="center" bgcolor="#bbffbb"
| 7 || September 30 || Kings || 5–4 ||  || Giguère (2–2–0) || LaBarbera (0–2–0) || 13,608 || 3–3–1 || Arrowhead Pond of Anaheim || 
|- align="center" bgcolor="#ffbbbb"
| 8 || October 1 || @ Coyotes || 4–3 || OT ||  ||  ||  || 3–3–2 || Glendale Arena || 
|-

|-
| Legend:

Regular season

|- align="center" bgcolor="#bbffbb" 
| 1 || October 5 || @ Blackhawks || 5–3 ||  || Giguere (1–0–0) || Khabibulin (0–1–0) || 16,533 || 1–0–0 || United Center ||  || bgcolor="bbffbb" | 2
|- align="center" bgcolor="#ffdddd" 
| 2 || October 8 || @ Predators || 3–2 || SO || Vokoun (2–0–0) || Giguere (1–0–1) || 16,279 || 1–0–1 || Gaylord Entertainment Center ||  || bgcolor="bbcaff" | 3 
|- align="center" bgcolor="#ffbbbb"
| 3 || October 10 || Oilers || 4–2 ||  || Markkanen (2–0–0) || Giguere (1–1–1) || 17,174 || 1–1–1 || Arrowhead Pond of Anaheim ||  || bgcolor="bbcaff" | 3
|- align="center" bgcolor="#bbffbb" 
| 4 || October 14 || Blue Jackets || 4–3 ||  || Giguere (2–1–1) || Leclaire (0–2–0) || 12,930 || 2–1–1 || Arrowhead Pond of Anaheim ||  || bgcolor="bbcaff" | 5
|- align="center" bgcolor="#ffbbbb"
| 5 || October 16 || @ Wild  || 4–1 ||  || Fernandez (1–0–1) || Giguere (2–2–1) || 18,568 || 2–2–1 || Xcel Energy Center ||  || bgcolor="ffbbbb" | 5
|- align="center" bgcolor="#ffbbbb"
| 6 || October 19 || @ Blues || 3–2 |||  || Lalime (2–4–0) || Bryzgalov (0–1–0) || 10,882 || 2–3–1 || Savvis Center ||  || bgcolor="ffbbbb" | 5
|- align="center" bgcolor="#ffbbbb"
| 7 || October 21 || @ Red Wings || 3–2 ||  || Legace (7–1–0) || Bryzgalov (0–2–0) || 20,066 || 2–4–1 || Joe Louis Arena ||  || bgcolor="ffbbbb" | 5
|- align="center" bgcolor="#bbffbb" 
| 8 || October 23 || Coyotes || 5–3 ||  || Bryzgalov (1–2–0) || LeNeveu (0–3–1) || 13,733 || 3–4–1 || Arrowhead Pond of Anaheim ||  || bgcolor="ffbbbb" | 7
|- align="center" bgcolor="#ffbbbb"
| 9 || October 25 || @ Kings || 3–1 ||  || LaBarbera (5–0–0) || Bryzgalov (1–3–0) || 18,118 || 3–5–1 || Staples Center ||  || bgcolor="ffbbbb" | 7
|- align="center" bgcolor="#bbffbb" 
| 10 || October 26 || Flames || 4–1 ||  || Giguere (3–2–1) || Kiprusoff (4–6–1) || 11,774 || 4–5–1 || Arrowhead Pond of Anaheim ||  || bgcolor="bbcaff" | 9 
|- align="center" bgcolor="#bbffbb" 
| 11 || October 28 || Blues || 6–4 ||  || Giguere (4–2–1) || Divis (0–1–0) || 12,510 || 5–5–1 || Arrowhead Pond of Anaheim ||  || bgcolor="bbcaff" | 11
|- align="center" bgcolor="#bbffbb" 
| 12 || October 30 || Coyotes || 3–2 ||  || Giguere (5–2–1) || LeNeveu (1–4–1) || 12,956 || 6–5–1 || Arrowhead Pond of Anaheim ||  || bgcolor="bbcaff" | 13
|-

|- align="center" bgcolor="#bbffbb" 
| 13 || November 1 || Predators || 4–1 ||  || Giguere (6–2–1) || Vokoun (7–2–1) || 11,690 || 7–5–1 || Arrowhead Pond of Anaheim ||  || bgcolor="bbcaff" | 15
|- align="center" bgcolor="#ffbbbb"
| 14 || November 3 || @ Avalanche || 4–3 ||  || Aebischer (6–3–0) || Bryzgalov (1–4–0) || 18,007 || 7–6–1 || Pepsi Center ||  || bgcolor="bbcaff" | 15
|- align="center" "#ffdddd"
| 15 || November 4 || Sharks || 1–0 || OT || Schaefer (5–0–0) || Giguere (6–2–2) || 12,546 || 7–6–2 || Arrowhead Pond of Anaheim ||  || bgcolor="bbcaff" | 16
|- align="center" "#ffdddd"
| 16 || November 6 || Wild || 4–3 || SO || Fernandez (5–2–1) || Giguere (6–2–3) || 14,053 || 7–6–3 || Arrowhead Pond of Anaheim ||  || bgcolor="ffbbbb" | 17
|- align="center" "#ffdddd"
| 17 || November 12 || @ Coyotes || 2–1 || OT || Joseph (8–5–0) || Giguere (6–2–4) || 16,358 || 7–6–4 || Glendale Arena ||  || bgcolor="ffbbbb" | 18
|- align="center" bgcolor="#ffbbbb"
| 18 || November 13 || Stars || 3–1 ||  || Turco (9–5–1) || Giguere (6–3–4) || 14,018 || 7–7–4 || Arrowhead Pond of Anaheim ||  || bgcolor="ffbbbb" | 18
|- align="center" bgcolor="#ffbbbb"
| 19 || November 16 || Stars || 4–2 ||  || Turco (10–5–1) || Bryzgalov (1–5–0) || 12,189 || 7–8–4 || Arrowhead Pond of Anaheim ||  || bgcolor="ffbbbb" | 18
|- align="center" bgcolor="#ffbbbb"
| 20 || November 18 || Avalanche || 3–2 ||  || Budaj (3–2–2) || Bryzgalov (1–6–0) || 15,614 || 7–9–4 || Arrowhead Pond of Anaheim ||  || bgcolor="ffbbbb" | 18
|- align="center" bgcolor="#ffbbbb"
| 21 || November 20 || Canucks || 3–2 ||  || Cloutier (8–3–1) || Bryzgalov (1–7–0) || 14,149 || 7–10–4 || Arrowhead Pond of Anaheim ||  || bgcolor="ffbbbb" | 18
|- align="center" bgcolor="#bbffbb" 
| 22 || November 22 || @ Coyotes || 2–1 ||  || Bryzgalov (2–7–0) || Joseph (9–7–0) || 13,696 || 8–10–4 || Glendale Arena ||  || bgcolor="ffbbbb" | 20
|- align="center" bgcolor="#ffbbbb"
| 23 || November 23 || @ Stars || 3–1 ||  || Turco (12–5–1) || Bryzgalov (2–8–0) || 18,532 || 8–11–4 || American Airlines Center ||  || bgcolor="ffbbbb" | 20
|- align="center" bgcolor="#bbffbb" 
| 24 || November 25 || Red Wings || 3–1 ||  || Bryzgalov (3–8–0) || Osgood (3–2–2) || 17,174 || 9–11–4 || Arrowhead Pond of Anaheim ||  || bgcolor="ffbbbb" | 22
|- align="center" bgcolor="#bbffbb" 
| 25 || November 27 || Blackhawks || 3–1 ||  || Bryzgalov (4–8–0) || Khabibulin (7–13–0) || 13,078 || 10–11–4 || Arrowhead Pond of Anaheim ||  || bgcolor="ffbbbb" | 24
|- align="center" bgcolor="#bbffbb" 
| 26 || November 30 || Coyotes || 6–1 ||  || Bryzgalov (5–8–0) || LeNeveu (2–5–2) || 12,050 || 11–11–4 || Arrowhead Pond of Anaheim ||  || bgcolor="ffbbbb" | 26
|-

|- align="center" bgcolor="#bbffbb" 
|27||December 3 || Thrashers || 2–1 ||  || Bryzgalov (6–8–0) || Garnett (3–5–1) || 13,532 || 12–11–4 || Arrowhead Pond of Anaheim ||  || bgcolor="ffbbbb" | 28
|- align="center" bgcolor="#ffbbbb"
|28||December 6 || Hurricanes || 6–2 ||  || Gerber (11–5–1) || Bryzgalov (6–9–0) || 13,045 || 12–12–4 || Arrowhead Pond of Anaheim ||  || bgcolor="ffbbbb" | 28
|- align="center" bgcolor="#ffdddd" 
|29||December 8 || @ Sabres || 3–2 || OT || Biron (11–4–1) || Giguere (6–3–5) || 12,504 || 12–12–5 || HSBC Arena ||  || bgcolor="ffbbbb" | 29
|- align="center" bgcolor="#bbffbb" 
|30||December 10 || @ Canadiens || 5–3 ||  || Giguere (7–3–5) || Theodore (12–6–5) || 21,273 || 13–12–5 || Bell Centre ||  || bgcolor="ffbbbb" | 31
|- align="center" bgcolor="#ffbbbb"
|31||December 12 || @ Maple Leafs || 3–2 ||  || Tellqvist (4–2–1) || Giguere (7–4–5) || 19,401 || 13–13–5 || Air Canada Centre ||  || bgcolor="ffbbbb" | 31
|- align="center" bgcolor="#bbffbb" 
|32||December 14 || Lightning || 4–2 ||  || Giguere (8–4–5) || Grahame (14–9–1) || 12,286 || 14–13–5 || Arrowhead Pond of Anaheim ||  || bgcolor="ffbbbb" | 33
|- align="center" bgcolor="#ffdddd" 
|33||December 16 || Kings || 4–3 || SO || Garon (11–7–0) || Giguere (8–4–6) || 17,174 || 14–13–6 || Arrowhead Pond of Anaheim ||  || bgcolor="ffbbbb" | 34
|- align="center" bgcolor="#bbffbb" 
|34||December 18 || Sharks || 5–4 ||  || Giguere (9–4–6) || Nabokov (7–8–4) || 16,297 || 15–13–6 || Arrowhead Pond of Anaheim ||  || bgcolor="ffbbbb" | 36
|- align="center" bgcolor="#ffbbbb"
|35||December 20 || @ Sharks || 4–2 ||  || Nabokov (8–8–4) || Giguere (9–5–6) || 16,172 || 15–14–6 || HP Pavilion at San Jose ||  || bgcolor="ffbbbb" | 36
|- align="center" bgcolor="#bbffbb" 
|36||December 21 || Blues || 6–3 ||  || Giguere (10–5–6) || Divis (0–3–0) || 13,381 || 16–14–6 || Arrowhead Pond of Anaheim ||  || bgcolor="bbcaff" | 38
|- align="center" bgcolor="#ffbbbb"
|37||December 28 || @ Blue Jackets || 1–0 ||  || Denis (6–14–0) || Giguere (10–6–6) || 17,387 || 16–15–6 || Nationwide Arena ||  || bgcolor="ffbbbb" | 38
|- align="center" bgcolor="#bbffbb" 
|38||December 31 || @ Blues || 5–4 || SO || Giguere (11–6–6) || Sanford (3–5–1) || 13,286 || 17–15–6 || Savvis Center ||  || bgcolor="ffbbbb" | 40
|-

|- align="center" bgcolor="#bbffbb" 
| 39 || January 1 || @ Predators || 4–2 ||  || Bryzgalov (7–9–0) || Vokoun (19–7–2) || 17,113 || 18–15–6 || Gaylord Entertainment Center ||  || bgcolor="ffbbbb" | 42
|- align="center" bgcolor="#ffdddd" 
| 40 || January 6 || @ Stars || 4–3 || SO || Hedberg (6–1–0) || Giguere (11–6–7) || 18,532 || 18–15–7 || American Airlines Center ||  || bgcolor="ffbbbb" | 43
|- align="center" bgcolor="#ffbbbb"
| 41 || January 7 || @ Wild || 4–1 ||  || Fernandez (15–5–3) || Bryzgalov (7–10–0) || 18,568 || 18–16–7 || Xcel Energy Center ||  || bgcolor="ffbbbb" | 43
|- align="center" bgcolor="#bbffbb" 
| 42 || January 9 || Kings || 6–2 ||  || Giguere (12–6–7) || Garon (19–10–0) || 17,174 || 19–16–7 || Arrowhead Pond of Anaheim ||  || bgcolor="ffbbbb" | 45
|- align="center" bgcolor="#ffdddd" 
| 43 || January 13 || Capitals || 3–2 || OT || Johnson (3–5–0) || Giguere (12–6–8) || 16,186 || 19–16–8 || Arrowhead Pond of Anaheim ||  || bgcolor="ffbbbb" | 46
|- align="center" bgcolor="#ffdddd" 
| 44 || January 16 || @ Bruins || 4–3 || OT || Thomas (1–0–1) || Bryzgalov (7–10–1) || 15,279 || 19–16–9 || TD Banknorth Garden ||  || bgcolor="ffbbbb" | 47
|- align="center" bgcolor="#bbffbb" 
| 45 || January 19 || @ Senators || 4–3 || SO || Giguere (13–6–8) || Hasek (23–7–3) || 19,387 || 20–16–9 || Corel Centre ||  || bgcolor="ffbbbb" | 49
|- align="center" bgcolor="#bbffbb" 
| 46 || January 21 || Panthers || 1–0 ||  || Giguere (14–6–8) || Luongo (18–20–7) || 17,011 || 21–16–9 || Arrowhead Pond of Anaheim ||  || bgcolor="ffbbbb" | 51
|- align="center" bgcolor="#ffdddd" 
| 47 || January 23 || @ Kings || 3–2 || SO || Garon (21–11–1) || Giguere (14–6–9) || 18,118 || 21–16–10 || Staples Center ||  || bgcolor="ffbbbb" | 52
|- align="center" bgcolor="#ffbbbb"
| 48 || January 25 || Oilers || 6–3 ||  || Markkanen (15–11–5) || Giguere (14–7–9) || 14,456 || 21–17–10 || Arrowhead Pond of Anaheim ||  || bgcolor="ffbbbb" | 52
|- align="center" bgcolor="#bbffbb" 
| 49 || January 26 || @ Sharks || 2–0 ||  || Bryzgalov (8–10–1) || Nabokov (13–13–5) || 16,174 || 22–17–10 || HP Pavilion at San Jose ||  || bgcolor="ffbbbb" | 54
|- align="center" bgcolor="#bbffbb" 
| 50 || January 28 || @ Kings || 6–2 ||  || Bryzgalov (9–10–1) || Garon (21–13–1) || 18,118 || 23–17–10 || Staples Center ||  || bgcolor="ffbbbb" | 56
|- align="center" bgcolor="#bbffbb" 
| 51 || January 30 || Kings || 4–3 || OT || Bryzgalov (10–10–1) || Garon (21–13–2) || 17,174 || 24–17–10 || Arrowhead Pond of Anaheim ||  || bgcolor="ffbbbb" | 58
|-

|- align="center" bgcolor="#ffbbbb"
| 52 || February 1 || Sharks || 6–4 ||  || Nabokov (14–13–6) || Bryzgalov (10–11–1) || 16,542 || 24–18–10 || Arrowhead Pond of Anaheim ||  || bgcolor="ffbbbb" | 58
|- align="center" bgcolor="#bbffbb" 
| 53 || February 4 || @ Sharks || 2–0 ||  || Giguere (15–7–9) || Nabokov (14–14–6) || 17,496 || 25–18–10 || HP Pavilion at San Jose ||  || bgcolor="ffbbbb" | 60
|- align="center" bgcolor="#ffdddd" 
| 54 || February 6 || @ Oilers || 6–5 || SO || Morrison (10–2–0) || Giguere (15–7–10) || 16,839 || 25–18–11 || Rexall Place ||  || bgcolor="ffbbbb" | 61
|- align="center" bgcolor="#ffbbbb"
| 55 || February 8 || @ Flames || 3–1 ||  || Kiprusoff (29–14–7) || Giguere (15–8–10) || 19,289 || 25–19–11 || Pengrowth Saddledome ||  || bgcolor="ffbbbb" | 61
|- align="center" bgcolor="#bbffbb" 
| 56 || February 10 || @ Canucks || 3–1 ||  || Bryzgalov (11–11–1) || Auld (24–16–3) || 18,630 || 26–19–11 || General Motors Place ||  || bgcolor="ffbbbb" | 63
|- align="center" bgcolor="#bbffbb" 
| 57 ||February 12 || Blackhawks || 4–1 ||  || Giguere (16–8–10) || Munro (3–4–2) || 17,174 || 27–19–11 || Arrowhead Pond of Anaheim ||  || bgcolor="ffbbbb" | 65
|- align="center" bgcolor="#bbcaff"
| colspan="3" | Feb. 15–26: 2006 Winter Olympics || colspan="6" |       || Palasport Olimpico || colspan="2" | Turin, Italy
|-

|- align="center" bgcolor="#ffbbbb"
| 58 || March 1 || Red Wings || 2–0 ||  || Osgood (14–5–3) || Giguere (16–9–10) || 16,606 || 27–20–11 || Arrowhead Pond of Anaheim ||  || bgcolor="ffbbbb" | 65
|- align="center" bgcolor="#bbffbb" 
| 59 || March 3 || Wild || 4–2 ||  || Giguere (17–9–10) || Roloson (6–17–1) || 17,048 || 28–20–11 || Arrowhead Pond of Anaheim ||  || bgcolor="ffbbbb" | 67
|- align="center" bgcolor="#ffdddd" 
| 60 || March 5 || Blue Jackets || 3–2 || SO || Leclaire (6–11–2) || Giguere (17–9–11) || 16,124 || 28–20–12 || Arrowhead Pond of Anaheim ||  || bgcolor="ffbbbb" | 68
|- align="center" bgcolor="#bbffbb" 
| 61 || March 7 || Sharks || 5–4 || OT || Giguere (18–9–11) || Nabokov (14–16–7) || 15,488 || 29–20–12 || Arrowhead Pond of Anaheim ||  || bgcolor="ffbbbb" | 70
|- align="center" bgcolor="#bbffbb" 
| 62 || March 11 || @ Coyotes || 5–3 ||  || Giguere (19–9–11) || Joseph (24–19–2) || 17,799 || 30–20–12 || Glendale Arena ||  || bgcolor="ffbbbb" | 72
|- align="center" bgcolor="#bbffbb" 
| 63 || March 12 || Coyotes || 5–2 ||  || Bryzgalov (12–11–1) || Sauve (3–5–0) || 17,174 || 31–20–12 || Arrowhead Pond of Anaheim ||  || bgcolor="bbcaff" | 74
|- align="center" bgcolor="#ffbbbb"
| 64 || March 15 || @ Red Wings || 3–1 ||  || Osgood (16–5–3) || Giguere (19–10–11) || 20,066 || 31–21–12 || Joe Louis Arena ||  || bgcolor="ffbbbb" | 74
|- align="center" bgcolor="#bbffbb" 
| 65 || March 17 || @ Blackhawks || 2–1 ||  || Giguere (20–10–11) || Khabibulin (13–21–3) || 12,031 || 32–21–12 || United Center ||  || bgcolor="ffbbbb" | 76
|- align="center" bgcolor="#bbffbb" 
| 66 || March 19 || @ Blue Jackets || 4–3 ||  || Giguere (21–10–11) || Denis (15–24–0) || 16,519 || 33–21–12 || Nationwide Arena ||  || bgcolor="bbcaff" | 78
|- align="center" bgcolor="#bbffbb" 
| 67 || March 20 || @ Stars || 2–1 ||  || Giguere (22–10–11) || Turco (36–17–3) || 18,150 || 34–21–12 || American Airlines Center ||  || bgcolor="bbcaff" | 80
|- align="center" bgcolor="#bbffbb" 
| 68 || March 22 || Avalanche || 5–4 || OT || Bryzgalov (13–11–1) || Budaj (10–8–5) || 15,623 || 35–21–12 || Arrowhead Pond of Anaheim ||  || bgcolor="bbcaff" | 82
|- align="center" bgcolor="#bbffbb" 
| 69 || March 24 || Predators || 6–3 ||  || Giguere (23–10–11) || Vokoun (35–15–7) || 16,377 || 36–21–12 || Arrowhead Pond of Anaheim ||  || bgcolor="bbcaff" | 84
|- align="center" bgcolor="#bbffbb" 
| 70 || March 25 || @ Coyotes || 5–2 ||  || Giguere (24–10–11) || LeNeveu (3–6–2) || 17,605 || 37–21–12 || Glendale Arena ||  || bgcolor="bbcaff" | 86
|- align="center" bgcolor="#ffbbbb"
| 71 || March 28 || @ Avalanche || 4–3 ||  || Budaj (12–8–6) || Giguere (24–11–11) || 18,007 || 37–22–12 || Pepsi Center ||  || bgcolor="bbcaff" | 86
|- align="center" bgcolor="#ffbbbb"
| 72 || March 29 || @ Stars || 2–1 ||  || Turco (39–17–3) || Giguere (24–12–11) || 17,764 || 37–23–12 || American Airlines Center ||  || bgcolor="bbcaff" | 86
|- align="center" bgcolor="#bbffbb" 
| 73 || March 31 || Stars || 5–4 || SO || Giguere (25–12–11) || Turco (39–17–4) || 17,174 || 38–23–12 || Arrowhead Pond of Anaheim ||  || bgcolor="bbcaff" | 88
|-

|- align="center" bgcolor="#bbffbb" 
| 74 || April 2 ||  Canucks || 6–2 ||  || Giguere (26–12–11) || Auld (32–23–5) || 17,174 || 39–23–12 || Arrowhead Pond of Anaheim ||  || bgcolor="bbcaff" | 90
|- align="center" bgcolor="#bbffbb" 
| 75 || April 4 || Kings || 6–2 ||  || Giguere (27–12–11) || Garon (31–23–3) || 17,174 || 40–23–12 || Arrowhead Pond of Anaheim ||  || bgcolor="bbcaff" | 92
|- align="center" bgcolor="#ffbbbb"
| 76 || April 6 || Stars || 5–3 ||  || Turco (40–17–5) || Giguere (27–13–11) || 17,174 || 40–24–12 || Arrowhead Pond of Anaheim ||  || bgcolor="bbcaff" | 92
|- align="center" bgcolor="#bbffbb" 
| 77 || April 8 || @ Kings || 4–2 ||  || Giguere (28–13–11) || Garon (31–25–3) || 17,242 || 41–24–12 || Staples Center ||  || bgcolor="bbcaff" | 94
|- align="center" style="background: #000078; color: white"
| 78 || April 10 || @ Canucks || 4–2 ||  || Giguere (29–13–11) || Auld (33–25–5) || 18,630 || 42–24–12 || General Motors Place ||  || 96
|- align="center" bgcolor="#ffbbbb" 
| 79 || April 11 || @ Flames || 3–0 ||  || Kiprusoff (41–20–10) || Bryzgalov (13–12–1) || 19,289 || 42–25–12 || Pengrowth Saddledome ||  || bgcolor="bbcaff" |  96
|- align="center" bgcolor="#ffbbbb"
| 80 || April 13 || @ Oilers || 2–1 ||  || Roloson (––) || Giguere (29–14–11) || 16,839 || 42–26–12 || Rexall Place ||  || bgcolor="bbcaff" |  96
|- align="center" bgcolor="#ffbbbb"
| 81 || April 15 || @ Sharks || 6–3 ||  || Toskala (23–7–4) || Giguere (29–15–11) || 17,496 || 42–27–12 || HP Pavilion at San Jose ||  || bgcolor="bbcaff" |  96
|- align="center" bgcolor="#bbffbb" 
| 82 || April 17 || Flames || 4–3 ||  || Giguere (30–15–11) || Boucher (4–8–0) || 17,174 || 43–27–12 || Arrowhead Pond of Anaheim ||  || bgcolor="bbcaff" |  98
|-

|-
| Legend:

|-
| "Points" Legend:

Playoffs

|- align="center" bgcolor="#ffbbbb"
| 1 || April 21 || @ Flames || 2–1 || 1OT || Kiprusoff (1–0) || Bryzgalov (0–1) || 19,289 || 0–1 || Pengrowth Saddledome || 
|- align="center" bgcolor="#bbffbb"
| 2 || April 23 || @ Flames || 4–3 || || Giguere (1–0) || Kiprusoff (1–1) || 19,289 || 1–1 || Pengrowth Saddledome || 
|- align="center" bgcolor="#ffbbbb"
| 3 || April 25 || Flames || 5–2 || || Kiprusoff (2–1) || Giguere (1–1) || 17,174 || 1–2 || Arrowhead Pond of Anaheim || 
|- align="center" bgcolor="#bbffbb"
| 4 || April 27 || Flames || 3–2 || 1OT || Giguere (2–1) || Kiprusoff (2–2) || 17,174 || 2–2 || Arrowhead Pond of Anaheim || 
|- align="center" bgcolor="#ffbbbb"
| 5 || April 29 || @ Flames || 3–2 || || Kiprusoff (3–2) || Giguere (2–2) || 19,289 || 2–3 || Pengrowth Saddledome || 
|- align="center" bgcolor="#bbffbb"
| 6 || May 1 || Flames || 2–1 || || Bryzgalov (1–1) || Kiprusoff (3–3) || 16,594 || 3–3 || Arrowhead Pond of Anaheim || 
|- align="center" bgcolor="#bbffbb"
| 7 || May 3 || @ Flames || 3–0 || || Bryzgalov (2–1) || Kiprusoff (3–4) || 19,289 || 4–3 || Pengrowth Saddledome || 
|-

|- align="center" bgcolor="#bbffbb"
| 1 || May 5 ||  Avalanche || 5–0 || || Bryzgalov (3–1) || Theodore (4–2) || 17,174 || 1–0 || Arrowhead Pond of Anaheim || 
|- align="center" bgcolor="#bbffbb"
| 2 || May 7 || Avalanche || 3–0 || || Bryzgalov (4–1) || Theodore (4–3) || 17,174 || 2–0 || Arrowhead Pond of Anaheim || 
|- align="center" bgcolor="#bbffbb"
| 3 || May 9 || @ Avalanche || 4–3 || 1OT || Bryzgalov (5–1) || Theodore (4–4) || 18,007 || 3–0 || Pepsi Center || 
|- align="center" bgcolor="#bbffbb"
| 4 || May 11 || @ Avalanche || 4–1 || || Bryzgalov (6–1) || Theodore (4–5) || 18,007 || 4–0 || Pepsi Center || 
|-

|- align="center" bgcolor="#ffbbbb"
| 1 || May 19 || Oilers || 3–1 || || Roloson (9–4) || Bryzgalov (6–2) || 17,174 || 0–1 || Arrowhead Pond of Anaheim || 
|- align="center" bgcolor="#ffbbbb"
| 2 || May 21 || Oilers || 3–1 || || Roloson (10–4) || Bryzgalov (6–3) || 17,264 || 0–2 || Arrowhead Pond of Anaheim || 
|- align="center" bgcolor="#ffbbbb"
| 3 || May 23 || @ Oilers || 5–4 || || Roloson (11–4) || Bryzgalov (6–4) || 16,839 || 0–3 || Rexall Place || 
|- align="center" bgcolor="#bbffbb"
| 4 || May 25 || @ Oilers || 6–3 || || Giguere (3–2) || Roloson (11–5) || 16,839 || 1–3 || Rexall Place || 
|- align="center" bgcolor="#ffbbbb"
| 5 || May 27 || Oilers || 2–1 || || Roloson (12–5) || Giguere (3–3) || 17,174 || 1–4 || Arrowhead Pond of Anaheim || 
|-

|-
| Legend:

Player statistics

Scoring
 Position abbreviations: C = Center; D = Defense; G = Goaltender; LW = Left Wing; RW = Right Wing
  = Joined team via a transaction (e.g., trade, waivers, signing) during the season. Stats reflect time with the Mighty Ducks only.
  = Left team via a transaction (e.g., trade, waivers, release) during the season. Stats reflect time with the Mighty Ducks only.

Goaltending

Awards and records

Awards

Milestones

Transactions
The Mighty Ducks were involved in the following transactions from February 17, 2005, the day after the 2004–05 NHL season was officially cancelled, through June 19, 2006, the day of the deciding game of the 2006 Stanley Cup Finals.

Trades

Players acquired

Players lost

Signings

Draft picks
The Ducks' picks at the 2005 NHL Entry Draft, July 30–31, 2005 in Ottawa, Ontario, Canada.

Farm teams
After nine seasons the Cincinnati Mighty Ducks ceased operations as the Portland Pirates became the new AHL affiliate.

Notes

References

Anaheim Ducks seasons
Anaheim
Anaheim
Mighty Ducks of Anaheim
Mighty Ducks of Anaheim